The House of de Vere were an English aristocratic family who derived their surname from Ver (department Manche, canton Gavray), in Lower Normandy, France. The family's Norman founder in England, Aubrey (Albericus) de Vere, appears in Domesday Book (1086) as the holder of a large fief in Essex, Suffolk, Cambridgeshire, and Huntingdonshire. His son and heir Aubrey II became Lord Great Chamberlain of England, an hereditary office, in 1133. His grandson Aubrey III became Earl of Oxford in the reign of King Stephen, but while his earldom had been granted by the Empress Matilda and eventually recognised by Stephen, it was not until January 1156 that it was formally recognised by Henry II and he began to receive the third penny of justice (one-third of the revenue of the shire court) from Oxfordshire.

For many centuries the family was headed by the Earl of Oxford until the death of the 20th Earl in 1703.

Among the offices the family held besides that of Lord Great Chamberlain was the forestership of Essex, and they founded the Essex religious houses of Colne Priory, Hatfield Broad Oak Priory, and Castle Hedingham Priory. Macaulay described the family as "the longest and most illustrious line of nobles that England has seen," and Tennyson's poem Lady Clara Vere de Vere made the name synonymous with ancient blood.

Notable family members
Aubrey de Vere I (died c. 1112), a tenant-in-chief in England of William the Conqueror
Aubrey de Vere II (c. 1080–1141), Lord Great Chamberlain of England
Aubrey de Vere III (c. 1115–1194), first Earl of Oxford
Rohese de Vere, Countess of Essex (c. 1110–1169 or after), founder of Chicksands Priory, Bedfordshire
William de Vere (1120–1198), Bishop of Hereford and author of a saint's life
Guy of Valence (fl. 1230s), supposed by Robert Steele, probably mistakenly, to have been a de Vere
Robert de Vere, Duke of Ireland (1362–1392), ninth Earl of Oxford and a favourite of King Richard II
Bridget de Vere (1584–1630/31), Countess of Berkshire
Diana Beauclerk, Duchess of St Albans (née Lady Diana de Vere, c. 1679–1742), courtier and Mistress of the Robes to Caroline, Princess of Wales
Frances Howard, Countess of Surrey (née de Vere, c. 1517–1577)
Susan de Vere, Countess of Montgomery (1587–1628/29)
Francis Vere (1560–1609), an English soldier, famed for his military career in the Low Countries
Horace Vere, 1st Baron Vere of Tilbury (1565–1635), a military leader during the Eighty Years' War and the Thirty Years' War
Mary de Vere (died c. 1624), a noblewoman

Twenty males headed the family as Earl of Oxford from 1141 to 1703:
Aubrey de Vere, 1st Earl of Oxford (c. 1115–1194)
Aubrey de Vere, 2nd Earl of Oxford (c. 1164–1214)
Robert de Vere, 3rd Earl of Oxford (c. 1173–1221), one of the 25 barons of the Magna Carta
Hugh de Vere, 4th Earl of Oxford (c. 1208–1263)
Robert de Vere, 5th Earl of Oxford (1240–1296) (forfeit 1265, restored soon afterwards)
Robert de Vere, 6th Earl of Oxford (1257–1331)
John de Vere, 7th Earl of Oxford (1312–1360)
Thomas de Vere, 8th Earl of Oxford (1337–1371)
Robert de Vere, 9th Earl of Oxford (1362–1392) (forfeit 1388)
Aubrey de Vere, 10th Earl of Oxford (1340–1400) (restored 1393)
Richard de Vere, 11th Earl of Oxford (1385–1417)
John de Vere, 12th Earl of Oxford (1408–1462)
John de Vere, 13th Earl of Oxford (1442–1513) (forfeit 1475, restored 1485) commander of the army of Henry Tudor at the Battle of Bosworth Field
John de Vere, 14th Earl of Oxford (1499–1526)
John de Vere, 15th Earl of Oxford (1482–1540)
John de Vere, 16th Earl of Oxford (1516–1562)
Edward de Vere, 17th Earl of Oxford (1550–1604), patron of the arts, a poet and playwright
Henry de Vere, 18th Earl of Oxford (1593–1625)
Robert de Vere, 19th Earl of Oxford (1575–1632)
Aubrey de Vere, 20th Earl of Oxford (1627–1703) (dormant 1703)

Genealogy 

This summary genealogical tree shows how the house of de Vere is related:

Coats of Arms 
Arms of notable members of the de Vere family:

See also
 De Vere (disambiguation), other people with the surname de Vere
 Vere (disambiguation), other people with the surname Vere
 De Vere Pedigree from the De Vere Society

References

External links